William Augustine Hickey (May 13, 1869 – October 4, 1933) was an American prelate of the Roman Catholic Church. He served as bishop of the Diocese of Providence in Rhode Island from 1921 until his death in 1933.

Biography

Early life 
William Hickey was born on May 13, 1869, in Worcester, Massachusetts to William and Margaret (née Troy) Hickey. His father served in both the Union Army and the Union Navy during the American Civil War. Hickey attended Holy Cross College in Worcester, then went to France to study at St. Sulpice Seminaryin Issy-les-Moulineaux. Upon his return to Massachusetts, Hickey attended St. John's Seminary in Boston.

Priesthood 
Hickey was ordained to the priesthood for the Diocese of Worcester by Archbishop John Williams on December 22, 1893.  He then held several pastoral roles in Worcester County.

From 1903 to 1917, Hickey served as a pastor in Gilbertville, Massachusetts, where he would preach in four different languages  (English, French, Polish, and Lithuanian) every Sunday. He was then transferred to St. John's Parish in Clinton, Massachusetts, where he built a parochial school and parish hall.  U.S. Senator David I. Walsh made these comments about Hickey:Father Hickey has...been a soldier camping in the homes of the sick and the poor under the white banner of the Church, fighting for salvation; has battled for Christ in the trenches of humanity.  Not a day has passed over his head since our boys first left Clinton that he has not prayed for his people.

Coadjutor Bishop and Bishop of Providence 
On January 16, 1919, Hickey was appointed coadjutor bishop of the Diocese of Providence and titular bishop of Claudiopolis in Isauria by Pope Benedict XV. Hickey received his episcopal consecration on April 10, 1919, from Bishop Thomas Beaven, with Bishops Louis Walsh and Daniel Feehan serving as co-consecrators, in the Cathedral of Saints Peter and Paul in Providence.  He was immediately appointed as apostolic administrator for the diocese by the incumbent Bishop Matthew Harkins., Hickey automatically became the third Bishop of Providence on Harkin's death on May 25, 1921.

Language controversy 
In 1923, Hickey started an initiative to upgrade and build new high schools in the diocese.  The diocese soon unveiled plans to upgrade Mount Saint Charles Academy, a secondary school in Woonsocket, Rhode Island.  The academy had been teaching classes in French to accommodate the later French Canadian Catholic population in the town.  However, it soon became clear that Hickey intended for the classes in the renovated school to be English only.  Parishioners became angry that they were being forced to pay for this policy. Elphege Daignault, a Woonsocket lawyer, became a protest leader.  In one swipe at Hickey, he labeled Irish-American clergy as “national assassins". In 1924, the dissidents founded the newspaper La Sentinelle, to express their opposition.  The dissidents were now called Sentinellists.

Daignault and the Sentinellists first appealed Hickey's plans to Archbishop Pietro Fumasoni-Biondi,  the apostolic delegate, or Vatican representative, to the United States.  When that appeal failed,  Daignault sued the diocese in state court in Rhode Island.  The Rhode Island Supreme Court eventually ruled that it had no jurisdiction in church affairs.  By this point, the controversy had gained publicity in French Canadian communities in the United States and Canada.  The Sentinellists finally sent a delegation to Vatican City to appeal directly to Pope Pius XI, but he refused to see them.

In 1927, Hickey excommunicated Daignault and other Sentinellists and placed La Sentinelle on the Index Librorum Prohibitorum., prohibiting Catholics from reading it.  Eventually Daignault and the others recanted their opposition to Hickey and he lifted their excommunications.

William Hickey died in Providence on October 4, 1933 from a heart attack at age 64.

References

External links
History of the State of Rhode Island and Providence Plantations
Official site of the Holy See

Episcopal succession

1869 births
1933 deaths
College of the Holy Cross alumni
Seminary of Saint-Sulpice (France) alumni
Saint John's Seminary (Massachusetts) alumni
People from Worcester, Massachusetts
Roman Catholic bishops of Providence
American Roman Catholic clergy of Irish descent
20th-century Roman Catholic bishops in the United States
Catholics from Massachusetts